Apinoglossa is a genus of leafroller moths in the family Tortricidae. This genus has a single species, Apinoglossa comburana, found in Puerto Rico.

See also
List of Tortricidae genera

References

External links
tortricidae.com

Tortricinae
Monotypic moth genera
Tortricidae genera
Moths described in 1891
Moths of the Caribbean